"Face It Alone" is a song by British rock band Queen. Written by Brian May, John Deacon, Roger Taylor and Freddie Mercury (credited as Queen) and produced by David Richards, Kris Fredriksson and Justin Shirley-Smith, recorded over thirty years prior to its eventual release, and originally thought "unsalvageable" by May and Taylor, it was released on 13 October 2022 as a single as part of promotion for The Miracle Collector’s Edition box set, which itself was released on 18 November 2022.

Music video
A lyric video was released on 13 October 2022. The official music video was uploaded on Queen's YouTube channel on 21 October. The music video features figures of the band along with footage of the sessions from The Miracle.

Critical reception
Reviews for "Face It Alone" were generally positive. Neil McCormick, writing for The Telegraph, rated the song 4/5 stars and called it "tender, moving [and] defiant". In a review for The Guardian, Alexis Petridis gave the song 3/5 stars, adding that whilst he felt it was "not a bad song, [and] nor is it anything approaching a classic", he praised Mercury's vocals, calling "Face It Alone" "moving and slender, a minor footnote that manages to pack an emotional punch regardless". A subsequent review from Rolling Stone magazine felt the song fit "effortlessly" into the band's back catalogue.

Chart performance
On the day of its digital release, "Face It Alone" became the most downloaded song in the world for five days in a row and topped the iTunes download charts in 21 countries. Placing on various charts around the world, the single peaked at number 7 on the US Hot Hard Rock Songs chart, number one on the Dutch Single Tip 100 chart, and number one on the UK Official Vinyl Singles Chart on 25 November 2022.

"Face It Alone" was the 14th best-selling vinyl single of 2022 in the UK behind "Brilliant Adventure" by David Bowie and ahead of "Rock the Casbah" by the Clash.

Personnel
Queen
 Freddie Mercury – lead vocals, backing vocals, keyboards
 Brian May – electric guitar
 Roger Taylor – drums, percussion
 John Deacon – bass guitar
Production
 David Richards – producer, engineer
 Kris Fredriksson – producer, engineer, music supervisor
 Justin Shirley-Smith – producer, music supervisor
 Josh Macrae – producer, engineer
 Bob Ludwig – mastering engineer

Charts

References

1988 songs
2022 singles
Queen (band) songs
EMI Records singles
Songs written by Brian May
Songs written by Freddie Mercury
Songs written by Roger Taylor (Queen drummer)
Songs written by John Deacon
Music videos directed by David Mallet (director)